Rapar is a city and a municipality in Kutch district in the Indian state of Gujarat. Particularly this area of Kutch is called 'Vagad'. The name derives from famous Vaghela rulers.it means the land of Vaghelas.

Geography
It has an average elevation of 79 metres (259 feet). Rapar is the main town in the Vagad Region of the Kutch District and the easternmost town of the Kutch District.

It is a very vibrant trading hub and shopping center for local people as there is no other major town within a 100 km radius. The nearest towns are Samakhiyali, Bhachau, Gandhidham, Anjar, Kandla and Adipur in Kutch district, and Morbi in Rajkot district and Radhanpur in Patan district. The district headquarters, Bhuj, is almost 140 km to the west. The nearest railway station is Chhitrod which is 18  km away. The nearest airport is Bhuj which is 140 km away. 

The nearby villages are Gagodar, Chhotapar, Pragpar, Bhutakiya, Bhimasar, Selari, Badargadh, Vajepar, Kidiyanagar, Padampar, Kalyanpar, Rav, Palanpar, Nandasar, Bela, Jatawada, Davri, Balasar Palanswa and others.

Rapar is nearest town en route to Dholavira, the Harappan civilization site.

Rapar was partially destroyed during the 2001 Gujarat earthquake but it has been developed again with good planning.

It has many temples like Swaminarayan Temple dedicated to Swaminarayana, Ratneswar Temple dedicated to Shiva, Ram Mandir dedicated to Rama, Dariyasthan dedicated to Dariyalal and two nice ponds and a public garden.

Politics
Current MLA of Rapar is Shree Virendrasinh Jadeja member of Bhartiya Janta Party who won by mere 450 votes against INC's Bhachubhai Arethiya during 2022 Gujarat assembly elections .

References

Cities and towns in Kutch district